Aggregate planning is a marketing activity that does an aggregate plan for the production process, in advance of 6 to 18 months, to give an idea to management as to what quantity of materials and other resources are to be procured and when, so that the total cost of operations of the organization is kept to the minimum over that period.

The quantity of outsourcing, subcontracting of items, overtime of labour, numbers to be hired and fired in each period and the amount of inventory to be held in stock and to be backlogged for each period are decided. All of these activities are done within the framework of the company ethics, policies, and long term commitment to the society, community and the country of operation.

Aggregate planning has certain pre-required inputs which are inevitable. They include:
Information about the resources and the facilities available.
Demand forecast for the period for which the planning has to be done.
Cost of various alternatives and resources. This includes cost of holding inventory, ordering cost, cost of production through various production alternatives like subcontracting, backordering and overtime.
Organizational policies regarding the usage of above alternatives.

"Aggregate Planning is concerned with matching supply and demand of output over the medium time range, up to approximately 12 months into the future. The term aggregate implies that the planning is done for a single overall measure of output or, at the most, a few aggregated product categories. The aim of aggregate planning is to set overall output levels in the near to medium future in the face of fluctuating or uncertain demands. Aggregate planning might seek to influence demand as well as supply.

Aggregate Plan Strategies

Level plans
Use a constant workforce & produce similar quantities each time period
Use inventories and back-orders to absorb demand peaks & valleys
Use inventories in better way to absorb the peak of demand and valleys

Chase plans
Minimize finished good inventories by trying to keep pace with demand fluctuations
Matches demand varying either work force level or output rate

Hybrid Strategies
Build-up inventory ahead of rising demand and use back-orders to level extreme peaks
Layoff or furlough workers during lulls
Subcontract production or hire temporary workers to cover short-term peaks
Reassign workers to preventive maintenance during lulls

Problems related to Aggregate Planning
Smoothing
Smoothing refers to costs that result from changing production and workforce levels from one period to the next.

Bottleneck Problems
It is the inability of the system to respond to sudden changes in demand as a result of capacity restrictions.

Planning Horizon
The number of periods for which the demand is to be forecasted, and hence the number of periods for which workforce and inventory levels are to be determined, must be specified in advance.

Treatment of Demand
Aggregate planning methodology requires the assumption that demand is known with certainty. This is simultaneously a weakness and a strength of the approach.

Further reading 
 Nahmias, Steven (2009). "Production and Operation Analysis". New York, New York: McGraw-Hill Inrwin
 Schroeder, R.G (2007). Operations management. New York, New York: McGraw-Hill Inrwin
 Stevenson, William J. (2007). Operations management. New York, New York: McGraw-Hill Inrwin

Marketing
Production planning